Evergestis unimacula, the large-spotted evergestis moth, is a moth in the family Crambidae. It was described by Augustus Radcliffe Grote and Coleman Townsend Robinson in 1867. It is found in North America, where it has been recorded from Georgia, Illinois, Indiana, Iowa, Maryland, Michigan, North Carolina, Ohio, Oklahoma, Ontario, Pennsylvania, Quebec, Tennessee and West Virginia.  Outliers have been recorded from Florida.

Etymology
The species name is derived from Latin unimacula (meaning one spot).

References

Evergestis
Moths described in 1867
Moths of North America